Bascanichthys pusillus is an eel in the family Ophichthidae (worm/snake eels). It was described by Alvin Seale in 1917. It is a tropical, marine eel which is known from the western central Pacific Ocean.

References

Ophichthidae
Fish described in 1917